Sahasam Cheyara Dimbhaka is a 1988 Telugu-language comedy film, produced by K. V. S. Raju under the Suchitra Movies banner and directed by Relangi Narasimha Rao. It stars Rajendra Prasad and Kalpana, with music composed by Raj–Koti. The film was recorded as a flop at the box office.

Plot
The film begins on Chandram (Rajendra Prasad) an adventuresome guy who hunts thrill in day-to-day life which throws him into turmoil. Chandram falls for a charming girl Saroja (Kalpana), her father Harmonium Hanumantha Rao (Kota Srinivasa Rao) a stage artist, expects Rs 1 lakh of reverse dowry. There onwards, Chandram toils for it but fails when his house owner Gomukham (Suthi Velu) emboldens him to get Rs 50,000 which can be easily tripled in the horse race. At the same time, Chandram's company proprietor Chidambaram (Raavi Kondala Rao) entrusts Rs 5 lakhs to safeguard as he is the most trustworthy. Chandram heists 50,000 from it, but unfortunately, races get canceled, so, he decides to keep it back. The next day strangely the remaining amount also is stolen by someone and the incident takes Chadram into a dichotomy. The same night, he is caught by his colleague Rita (Rajitha) when he divulges her reality and requests to maintain secrecy. Rita has a unique habit of noting any which she spots immediately in her diary. Now, Chandram observes someone's presence, so, he locks Rita in his room and moves for a search. Here, a thunderbolt, in his return finds Rita dead which makes Chandram panic. After crossing many hurdles he disposes of Rita's body. Thereafter, he lands at Kalpana's residence and reveals the entire story. Soon, Kalpana recalls Rita's habit of writing dairy when Chandram rushes back to her corpse along with Hanumantha Rao. But sadly, they have no idea what it is already dropped into Chandram's pocket. At present, Chandram & Hanumantha Rao are caught by the police and indicted for the crime but they abscond. During that plight, Kalpana contacts a Private Detective Pond (Suthi Veerabhadra Rao) to resolve the case who accompanies with his assistant (Srilakshmi) and digs the matter. Just after, he discovers the convict behind the robbery is the proprietor's brother-in-law (Eeswar Rao). However, Chandram & Hanumantha Rao are eluding from police in guise. After a few comic incidents, as a flabbergast, it is uncovered from Rita's diary that the felon is Harmonium Hanumantha Rao. Indeed, Hanumantha Rao is a gangster who performs illegal activities in the veil of an entertainer. Once Rita witnessed a murder made by him for which he slaughtered her too. Finally, Hanumantha Rao is sentenced and the movie ends on a happy note with the marriage of Chandram & Kalpana.

Cast
Rajendra Prasad as Chandram
Kalpana as Saroja
Kota Srinivasa Rao as Harmonium Hanumantha Rao
Suthi Veerabhadra Rao as Pond
Suthi Velu as Gomukham
Raavi Kondala Rao as Chidambaram
Vidya Sagar as Inspector
Eswara Rao as Chidambaram's brother-in-law
Srilakshmi as Pond's assistant
Rajitha as Rita
Chilakala Radha as Haigamana

Soundtrack

Music composed by Raj–Koti. Music released on LEO Audio Company.

References

External links

1980s Telugu-language films
Indian comedy films
Films directed by Relangi Narasimha Rao
Films scored by Raj–Koti
1988 comedy films
1988 films